Definition of a Band is the third studio album by the R&B band Mint Condition. It was released on September 24, 1996, on Perspective Records. Definition of a Band was Mint Condition's most successful recording to date, yielding both a hit single as well as a Gold certification from the RIAA.

Background
Before the release of the album, the band were faced with label troubles. Their mentors and label heads Jimmy Jam & Terry Lewis severed ties with Perspective Records. As a result, Mint Condition were moved to its parent company A&M Records, though the company kept the Perspective name for the release of Definition of a Band. This would be their final studio album released under Perspective Records. Another album released under the label was their greatest hits anthology The Collection (1991-1998)- an album that contained their hits alongside 12 inch versions, B-sides and remixes. They would move to Elektra Entertainment for their next album Life's Aquarium.

Commercial performance
The album charted at number 76 on the Billboard 200 and number 13 on the R&B/Hip-Hop albums chart.

Two singles were released from Definition of a Band. The first single, "What Kind of Man Would I Be", charted at number 17 on the Billboard Hot 100 and 2 on R&B/Hip-Hop Singles and Tracks. It sold 600,000 copies domestically and was certified gold by the RIAA. Its video was directed by art director Frank Kozik. The second single, "You Don't Have To Hurt No More", charted at number 32 on the Billboard Hot 100 and 10 on R&B/Hip-Hop Singles and Tracks. Its video was directed by Devo frontman Gerald Casale. This album is their third studio album to be mastered by Brian Gardner- who also worked on their previous album, 1993's From the Mint Factory as well as their 1991 debut ''Meant to Be Mint.

Track listing

Personnel
 
 Stokley Williams - vocals, drums, percussion, guitar, bass, keyboards, producer, composer
 Homer O'Dell - vocals, guitar, drums, percussion, producer, composer
 Ricky Kinchen - vocals, bass, keyboards, guitar, producer, composer
 Keri Lewis - vocals, keyboards, organ, piano, drums, guitar, producer, composer
 Jeff Allen - saxophone, vocals, keyboards
 Larry Waddell - keyboards, vocals, piano
 Chris Dave - drums, percussion
 Lil' Roger Lynch - vocoder
 Mint Condition - record engineering
 Ira Ferguson - record engineering
 Jeff Taylor - record engineering
 Dave Rideau - record engineering
 Steve Hodge - mixing
 Dave Rideau - mixing
 Rich Travali - mixing
 Keith Lewis - mixing
 David Green - mixing
 Mint Condition - executive production
 Jimmy Jam & Terry Lewis - executive production
 Brian Gardner - mastering
 Lisa Pearson - photography
 Tom Tavee - photography
 Greg Ross - art direction & design

Charts

Weekly charts

Year-end charts

References

1996 albums
Mint Condition (band) albums
Perspective Records albums